nl is a file format for presenting and archiving mathematical programming problems. Initially, this format has been invented for connecting solvers to AMPL. It has also been adopted by other systems such as COIN-OR (as one of the input formats), FortSP (for interacting with external solvers), and Coopr (as one of its output formats).

The nl format supports a wide range of problem types, among them:
 Linear programming
 Quadratic programming
 Nonlinear programming
 Mixed-integer programming
 Mixed-integer quadratic programming with or without convex quadratic constraints
 Mixed-integer nonlinear programming
 Second-order cone programming
 Global optimization
 Semidefinite programming problems with bilinear matrix inequalities
 Complementarity problems (MPECs) in discrete or continuous variables
 Constraint programming

The nl format is low-level and is designed for compactness, not for readability. It has both binary and textual representation.
Most commercial and academic solvers accept this format either directly or through special driver programs.

The open-source AMPL Solver Library distributed via Netlib and AMPL/MP library provide nl parsers that are used in many solvers.

See also
sol (format) - a file format for presenting solutions of mathematical programming problems

References

Mathematical optimization software
Computer file formats